Mesosa pieli is a species of beetle in the family Cerambycidae. It was described by Maurice Pic in 1936. It is known from China.

References

pieli
Beetles described in 1936